CitySprouts is a 501(c)(3) nonprofit organization based in Cambridge, Massachusetts that partners with public school teachers and other school staff to develop school gardens in public school communities in Boston and Cambridge.

Background 
CitySprouts began in 2001 when a small group of parents, a teacher and a school principal came together to create a schoolyard learning garden that would be accessible to every child in their school. They were motivated by a variety of factors. They knew there were too few opportunities for urban children to explore their natural environment. They felt public school teachers’ need for more hands-on, experiential learning, especially in science. Lastly, they shared concern about children knowing little about food systems, including where their own food came from.

They believed school gardens could have an enormous impact on both children’s learning and on their good health. They envisioned a schoolyard garden with natural habitats that invited children to wonder and explore, and a place to gain important social skills and taste food they had grown themselves. Few school garden models existed that were designed for access by struggling public schools. CitySprouts’ founders were guided by the vision of learning gardens in urban, high-need schools that were woven into the fabric of the school community.

CitySprouts quickly developed an on-going collaboration with Cambridge Public School science department to ensure strong connections between the district’s school learning gardens and its STEM curriculum. By 2009 the CitySprouts program had expanded to every K-8 school in Cambridge Public School District. In 2012, CitySprouts began building an equivalent sized cohort of school partnerships in Boston Public Schools. CitySprouts soon launched a school garden-based summer and after school program for middle schoolers based on science, technology, engineering and math (STEM) practices through an ecosystems and food systems lens.

In 2018, CitySprouts announced an early learning initiative in partnership with Boston schools. Through a year-long series of teacher workshops, CitySprouts early learning initiative will bridge the PreK – Grade 2 science standards and the school learning garden to increase the number of Boston children entering third grade with a solid foundation in scientific thinking and content knowledge.

CitySprouts is notable in the field of garden-based education for its long-standing relationships with the school districts it serves. Both Cambridge Public Schools and Boston Public Schools have contracts with CitySprouts that provide a significant portion of the program’s operating expenses. CitySprouts is a charter member of the Boston Public School Portfolio Opportunity, organizations vetted for program quality and alignment with the district’s goals. CitySprouts was selected as a charter organization in the BoSTEM education, innovation & research initiative in 2017.

Over the course of its history, CitySprouts has emerged as a leader in the 21st century garden-based education movement. It was recognized in 2008 as a regional social innovator by Boston-based Social Innovation Forum. In 2015, founding director Jane Hirschi published Ripe for Change: Garden-Based Learning in Schools (Harvard Education Press 2015), describing the new model of garden-based learning in urban school districts around the country

Mission
The CitySprouts mission is to develop, implement, and maintain beautiful, resource-rich school gardens in collaboration with public school communities. Integrated into the curriculum, CitySprouts gardens inspire teachers, students, and families to develop a deep, connection to hands-on science, edible education, and the opportunity to explore the natural world in the neighborhoods where they live, learn, and play.

See also
Edible schoolyard
White House Vegetable Garden

References

Non-profit organizations based in Massachusetts
Organizations established in 2000
Health in Massachusetts
United States educational programs

https://www.hepg.org/hel-home/issues/28_6/helarticle/take-the-common-core-outdoors_554

https://www.gse.harvard.edu/news/15/05/harvard-edcast-roots-school-gardening-movement

https://www.huffpost.com/entry/school-gardens_n_7119898

https://www.citysprouts.org/mission-impact